Night Life is the sixth album by country western singer and guitarist Ray Price, backed by his regular touring band, the Cherokee Cowboys.  The album was released in 1963 on the Columbia Records label. The album was included in Robert Dimery's 1001 Albums You Must Hear Before You Die.

Reception
Night Life was Ray Price's first LP to hit the charts.  It was released in April, 1963, but Billboard didn't start publishing a Country Album chart until January, 1964.  At that time, it was still selling well enough to appear and in the chart's second week, it was the number one album, the first of five to reach #1 during Price's career.

Cub Koda in an Allmusic retrospective review felt that the album was "the last gasp of true honky tonk, the first stab at mainstreaming it into the Nashville sound of the 1960s, or country music's first concept album".

Track listing 
 "Introduction and Theme / Night Life" (Walt Breeland, Paul Buskirk, Willie Nelson) - 2:05 / 4:41
 "Lonely Street" (Carl Belew, Kenny Sowder, W.S. Stevenson) - 3:01
 "The Wild Side of Life" (Arlie Carter, William Warren) - 2:59
 "Sittin' and Thinkin'" (Charlie Rich) - 2:47
 "The Twenty-Fourth Hour" (Ray Price) - 2:53
 "A Girl in the Night" (Hank Thompson) - 2:49
 "Pride" (Wayne P. Walker, Irene Stanton) - 2:39
 "There's No Fool Like a Young Fool" (Bette Thomasson) - 2:58
 "If She Could See Me Now" (Hank Cochran) - 2:42
 "Bright Lights and Blonde Haired Women" (Eddie Kirkland) - 2:26
 "Are You Sure" (Buddy Emmons, Willie Nelson) - 2:23
 "Let Me Talk to You" (Don Stewart Davis, Danny Dill)- 3:05

Personnel 
Ray Price - vocals, guitar
Willie Nelson - vocals, bass guitar
Johnny Paycheck - vocals, electric guitar, acoustic guitar, bass guitar, steel guitar
Buddy Emmons - pedal-steel-guitar
Floyd Cramer - piano

References 

Ray Price (musician) albums
1963 albums
Columbia Records albums